Lars Tunbjörk (15 February 1956 – 8 April 2015) was a Swedish photographer known for his "deadpan portraits of office spaces and suburban lifestyles".

Background
Tunbjörk was born in the Swedish town of Borås, a place which was a big influence for his work throughout his career. He was also influenced early on by Swedish photographer Christer Stromholm and American photographer William Eggleston.

His photographs can be found in the collections of the Museum of Modern Art, the Centre Pompidou and the Maison Européenne de la Photographie in Paris. Tunbjörk was a member of Agence Vu and worked for The New York Times Magazine, Time, GEO, and others.

Exhibitions

1993: Hasselblad center, Gothenburg
1994: Nordiska museet, Stockholm
1995: International Center of Photography, New York City
1998: Fotografisk Center, Copenhagen, Denmark
1999: Galerie Vu, Paris, France
2002: Arbetets museum, Norrköping
2002: Kulturhuset, Stockholm
2002: Home, Hasselblad Center, Gothenburg
2004: Moskva Fotobiennal, Russia
2004: Hembygd, Borås konstmuseum
2007: Open Eye Gallery, Liverpool,
2007: Winter/Home, Moderna Museet
2011: L.A Office, Shop, Wunderbaum, Skellefteå Konsthall
2018: Retrospective, Fotografiska, Stockholm.

References

1956 births
2015 deaths
People from Borås
Swedish photographers